= Paris visite =

Parisian discount travel card for tourists

The Paris Visite Ticket is a travel pass for tourists. It provides unlimited public transport in the Île-de-France on all services provided by the RATP (the regional public transport authority) and the SNCF (the state-owned national railway operator). It is valid for 1 day, 2 days, 3 days or 5 days from the date of issue, and can be renewed.

== Eligibility ==
The Paris Visite Ticket is provided to tourists.

The ticket costs €30.60 for 1 day, €45.40 for 2 days, €63.80 for 3 days or €78.00 for 5 days.

The ticket can be stored on a Navigo Easy Travel Card, or a Navigo on Smartphone.
